Kappa Pi Kappa, also known as Pi Kap and formerly known as Tri-Kap, Kappa Chi Kappa, and Kappa Kappa Kappa, is a local men's fraternity at Dartmouth College in Hanover, New Hampshire. The fraternity was founded in 1842 and is the second-oldest fraternity at Dartmouth College. Pi Kap is the oldest local fraternity in the United States. It is located at 1 Webster Avenue, Hanover, New Hampshire.

History
Kappa Kappa Kappa, using from inception the Greek letter  repeated three times, was founded on July 13, 1842, by Harrison Carroll Hobart and two of his closest companions, Stephen Gordon Nash, and John Dudley Philbrick, all Class of 1842. The society was based on the principles of democracy, loyalty to Dartmouth, and equality of opportunity. Originally a literary and debate society, Pi Kap officially became a social society in 1905 and has remained so ever since, making it the oldest extant local fraternity in the country. 

Pi Kap was the first student society at Dartmouth with its own meeting place, a building called The Hall, which was originally where the Hopkins Center for the Arts is today. Opened on July 28, 1860, the Hall served as Tri-Kap's home until the society moved into the Parker House in 1894. Parker House was where the modern-day Silsby Hall is. In 1923, the society moved into 1 Webster Avenue, where it resides to this day.

Over the years, Tr-Kap's name remained problematic, due to name-only similarity to the Ku Klux Klan, an unaffiliated racist organization that uses similar, but English letters.  Thus, in April 1992, Kappa Kappa Kappa changed its name to Kappa Chi Kappa. On October 23, 1995, the group changed their name back to Kappa Kappa Kappa.

The issue persisted, and after a period of consensus-building, on May 18, 2022, Kappa Kappa Kappa again changed its name to Kappa Pi Kappa.

Notable alumni

Alex M. Azar (1988), Secretary of U.S. Department of Health and Human Services
Henry Moore Baker (1864), U.S. Congressman from New Hampshire
John Barrett (1889), U.S. Minister to Siam, the Argentine Republic, Panama, and Colombia
Charles Henry Bell (1844), U.S. Senator and Governor of New Hampshire
Henry Eben Burnham (1865), U.S. Senator from New Hampshire
Sherman Everett Burroughs (1894), U.S. Congressman from New Hampshire
Channing H. Cox (1901), Governor of Massachusetts
Irving Webster Drew (1870), U.S. Senator from New Hampshire
Samuel D. Felker (1882), Governor of New Hampshire
Michael Fisch (1983), Chair of Board of Trustees Princeton Theological Seminary and Founder Private Equity Firm American Securities
Winfield Scott Hammond (1884), Governor of Minnesota
Frank A. Haskell (1854), author of famous first-hand account of the Battle of Gettysburg
Nick Lowery (1978), National Football League player and Three-time Pro Bowl kicker
Samuel Walker McCall (1874), Governor of Massachusetts
Paul Donnelly Paganucci (1953), professor at the Tuck School
Nitya Pibulsonggram (1962), Foreign Minister of Thailand and former Thai Ambassador to the United States
Ambrose A. Ranney (1844), U.S. Congressman from Massachusetts
Peter Robinson (1979), White House speechwriter for President Ronald Reagan
David Rosenbaum (1963), New York Times journalist
"Dr. Bob" Smith (1902), co-founder of Alcoholics Anonymous
Douglas Walgren (1963), U.S. Congressman from Pennsylvania

Honorary alumni
Lewis Cass, Governor of Michigan, U.S. Senator, and presidential nominee
Rufus Choate (1819), U.S. Senator from Massachusetts
Daniel Clark (1834), U.S. Senator from New Hampshire
Benjamin Franklin Flanders (1842), Governor of Louisiana
Daniel Webster (1801), U.S. Senator from Massachusetts, Congressman, Ambassador to France, and Secretary of State
Levi Woodbury (1809), Governor of New Hampshire, U.S. Senator, Secretary of the Treasury, and U.S. Supreme Court Justice

See also
List of social fraternities and sororities

References

External links

Kappa Kappa Kappa – Dartmouth Office of Residential Life
Halls, Tombs and Houses: Student Society Architecture at Dartmouth

Dartmouth College Greek organizations
Fraternities and sororities in the United States
Local fraternities and sororities
Men's organizations in the United States
Student organizations established in 1842
1842 establishments in New Hampshire